Yellville is a city and county seat in Marion County, Arkansas, United States. Yellville is located in the Ozark Mountains along the banks of Crooked Creek, and neighbors the small town of Summit to the north. The population was 1,178 at the 2020 census. The town's original name is preserved in the Shawnee Town Branch, a local creek. The town also holds an annual Turkey Trot Festival.

History
Yellville is named after Archibald Yell, who was the first member of the United States House of Representatives from Arkansas and the second governor of Arkansas. He was killed at the Battle of Buena Vista during the Mexican–American War. Yellville existed well before Arkansas became a state, though originally known as "Shawneetown".

Marion County was formed in 1836, shortly after statehood. Shawneetown was then renamed Yellville. An old tale claims Archibald Yell offered $50 to do so, but never paid the money. True or not, Governor Yell's descendants heard the story and paid the overdue "bill" several years ago. Yell's name can be seen elsewhere in the state, including Yell County and Archibald Yell Boulevard in Fayetteville. Several biographies of him have been written, the most recent published by the University of Arkansas Press in Fayetteville.

During the late 1840s, Yellville was the scene of several prolonged gunfights during the Tutt–Everett War. John A. Schnabel organized his Confederate cavalry battalion in the town in 1863.

Geography
Yellville is located in central Marion County at  (36.229723, −92.685310). It is bordered to the north by the small city of Summit.

Climate
Yellville, located in the Arkansas Ozarks, has a humid continental-subtropical climate, with cold-to-mild winters and hot, humid summers.

Demographics

2020 census

As of the 2020 United States census, there were 1,178 people, 416 households, and 271 families residing in the city.

2000 census
As of the census of 2000, there were 1,312 people, 535 households, and 356 families residing in the city. The racial makeup of the city was 97.71% White, 0.76% Native American, 0.23% Asian, 0.08% Pacific Islander, and 1.22% from two or more races.  0.53% of the population were Hispanic or Latino of any race.

There were 535 households, out of which 30.7% had children under the age of 18 living with them, 48.8% were married couples living together, 15.0% had a female householder with no husband present, and 33.3% were non-families. 30.3% of all households were made up of individuals, and 18.3% had someone living alone who was 65 years of age or older.  The average household size was 2.31 and the average family size was 2.84.

In the city, the population was spread out, with 24.2% under the age of 18, 9.0% from 18 to 24, 22.3% from 25 to 44, 22.3% from 45 to 64, and 22.3% who were 65 years of age or older.  The median age was 41 years. For every 100 females, there were 83.8 males.  For every 100 females age 18 and over, there were 79.6 males.

The median income for a household in the city was $26,250, and the median income for a family was $31,793. Males had a median income of $26,000 versus $18,056 for females. The per capita income for the city was $12,618.  About 13.2% of families and 17.7% of the population were below the poverty line, including 22.2% of those under age 18 and 13.8% of those age 65 or over.

Human resources

Education

Primary and secondary education
Public education for early childhood, elementary and secondary school students is provided by the Yellville–Summit School District, which leads to graduation from Yellville–Summit High School.

Higher education
In 1890, Yellville College was established in the city along College Street. The institution was demolished in 1925. Today, neither Yellville nor Marion County contain any institutions of higher education. The nearest are Arkansas State University Mountain Home, in Mountain Home, and North Arkansas College in Harrison, both two-year public schools. Nearby four-year education is offered by College of the Ozarks, a Christian liberal-arts college in Point Lookout, Missouri, and Lyon College, a private liberal arts college in Batesville. The nearest four-year public school is Arkansas Tech University in Russellville.

Library system
The Marion County Library is located at 308 Old Main in Yellville. The library offers books, e-books, media, reference, youth, and genealogy services.

Public safety
Yellville and Marion County operate under a joint city/county law enforcement agreement.

Culture and contemporary life

Buffalo National River
Yellville is popular for its proximity to the Buffalo National River,  to the south via State Highway 14. During the summer, tourists visit the area and Yellville becomes a hub for shopping and lodging for them. Activities and services in the area include horseback trail riding, canoeing, and cabin rentals. Other area attractions include the more than 1,000 caves that exist in Marion County, and the famous "Rush" ghost town located in the Buffalo Point area—a turn-of-the-century ghost town from the zinc mining heyday of the area. Abandoned mines are visible along many of the hiking trails at Rush, but are fenced off due to safety concerns. Recent arson has destroyed a few of the historic buildings of the Rush ghost town.

Bull Shoals Dam and Reservoir / White River
Most of northern Marion County is made up of water—most notably, the waters created by the Bull Shoals Dam. Eastern Marion County's border with Baxter County is marked by the White River. Water skiing, pontoon boating, and fishing are all popular summer activities at the Bull Shoals Lake and White River areas.

Fred Berry Conservation Education Center on Crooked Creek

In 1999, Fred Berry, a former counselor and teacher at the Yellville-Summit School District, donated the funding to create an educational center at Kelley's Access on Crooked Creek, located near the Yellville City Park. With additional donations and a "conservation tax", the plan was put into action. On June 17, 2005, the Fred Berry Conservation Education Center on Crooked Creek opened. It is one of four education centers with the Arkansas Game and Fish Commission.

Annual cultural events
One of the longest traditions in Yellville is the annual Turkey Trot festival sponsored by the Mid-Marion County Rotary Club. Beginning in 1945 with the first turkey dropped from the roof of the Marion County Courthouse, the festival continues today. It is held every second weekend of October with the best-known attraction being live turkeys that are dropped from airplanes over the town square. The event has been criticized in the past by People for the Ethical Treatment of Animals and others. The Turkey Trot festival also includes a pageant, dinners, musical entertainment, a 5 kilometer run, a parade, and a nationally recognized turkey calling contest sponsored by the National Wild Turkey Federation. Crafts and tools related to the hunting of wild turkeys are also sold in streetside booths along the town square.

Infrastructure

Major highways

 US 62/US 412
 U.S. Route 62 Business
 Highway 14
 Highway 202
 Highway 235

Utilities
Entergy Arkansas is the sole provider of electricity in almost all of Marion County, including Yellville. Natural gas service is available from Black Hills Energy. Sanitation is provided by Nabors Sanitation, and cable television service is provided by Yelcot

The Yellville Water Department purchases potable water from the Marion County Regional Water Association, whose source is Bull Shoals Lake. The Yellville Water Department has 2,329 retail population served, and is responsible for maintenance of the water system and customer billing.

Notable people
Kelley Linck, represented Yellville and surrounding area in the Arkansas House of Representatives from 2011 to 2016

References

External links
 City of Yellville unofficial website
 Yellville-Summit School District
 Yellville Area Chamber of Commerce
 Fred Berry Conservation Education Center on Crooked Creek - Arkansas Game and Fish Commission
  Yell's Repay 169 Year Old Debt - Harrison Daily Times via Southshore.com
 The Mountaineer Echo, local newspaper
 Buffalo National River - National Park Service

Cities in Arkansas
Cities in Marion County, Arkansas
County seats in Arkansas